Bay Point is an unincorporated community in Monroe County, Florida, United States, located in the lower Florida Keys in the Saddlebunch Keys near mile marker 15 on US 1 (the Overseas Highway).

Geography
Bay Point is flat with very few low hills.

References

Unincorporated communities in Monroe County, Florida
Unincorporated communities in Florida
Populated coastal places in Florida on the Atlantic Ocean